Soslan Tamerlanovich Dzhioyev (born 25 February 1989) is a Russian former professional footballer.

Club career
He played in the Russian Football National League for FC Alania Vladikavkaz in 2008.

External links
 
 

1989 births
Sportspeople from Vladikavkaz
Living people
Russian footballers
Association football midfielders
FC Spartak Moscow players
FC Spartak Vladikavkaz players
FC Neftekhimik Nizhnekamsk players
A Lyga players
Russian expatriate footballers
Expatriate footballers in Lithuania
FC Chayka Peschanokopskoye players